Michael Spitzer is a British musicologist and academic.

Early life
Michael Spitzer was born in 1966 in Nigeria. He was raised in Israel, and in 1973, emigrated to the UK. He was a refugee of the Yom Kippur War.

He completed his undergraduate studies at Merton College, Oxford, and his doctorate at the University of Southampton (awarded in 1993).

Career
He taught at Durham University, where he was appointed to a readership in 2005; he then moved to the University of Liverpool after the 2009–10 academic year, and remains a professor of music there as of 2018. He is a past president, and a past chair of the editorial board, of the Society for Music Analysis. 

According to his university profile, he is a specialist in Beethoven "with interests in aesthetics and critical theory, cognitive metaphor, and music and affect." 

He inaugurated the series of International Conferences on Music and Emotion at Durham in 2009.
He co-organized the International Conference on the Analysis of Popular Music (Liverpool, 2013). 
His publications explore the intersections between music theory, philosophy, and psychology.

Works
Spitzer's book Metaphor and Musical Thought (2004) is among the first two book-length music theory publications on metaphor and music music analysis, and distinguishes itself by synthesizing literary metaphor with cognitive-science approaches to metaphor.

Selected publications 
 Metaphor and Musical Thought (University of Chicago Press, 2004).
 Music as Philosophy: Adorno and Beethoven's Late Style (Indiana University Press, 2006).
 (Editor) Beethoven (Ashgate, 2015).
 A History of Emotion in Western Music: A Thousand Years from Chant to Pop (Oxford University Press, 2020).
 The Musical Human: A History of Life on Earth, (Bloomsbury, 2021)

References

External links
 
 </ref>

Living people
British musicologists
Alumni of Merton College, Oxford
Alumni of the University of Southampton
Academics of Durham University
Academics of the University of Liverpool
Year of birth missing (living people)